Lextran (officially the Transit Authority of the Lexington-Fayette Urban County Government) is a public transportation bus system serving Lexington, Kentucky. Lextran operates 25 bus routes throughout the city of Lexington. Buses converge at the Downtown Transit Center located at 220 East Vine Street.

Lextran operates seven days a week from 5:00 am to midnight. Through a partnership with the Bluegrass Area Chapter of the American Red Cross, Lextran also operates Wheels. Lextran Wheels is a shared ride, door-to-door public transportation service for Lexington-Fayette County area citizens with disabilities. Lextran also provides service to the University of Kentucky, operating two routes around campus.

Even though Lexington and Fayette County are a consolidated government, Lextran does not provide service outside the city of Lexington.

History 

Prior to Lextran's current existence, Lexington was served by numerous private transit systems. The first such system was the Lexington Railway Company streetcars which began operation in 1874 which used horse-drawn stagecoaches. The name changed to the Lexington Street Railway Company soon after to avoid confusion with the steam railroads. In 1890, the system was upgraded to streetcars and was referred to as the Kentucky Traction and Terminal Company. The streetcars ceased operations in 1938 when they were replaced by motorized buses under the Lexington Railway System name, which later became the Lexington Transit Corporation.

By the early 1970s, expenses associated with the operation of the motorized buses soon outstripped revenue for the Lexington Transit Corporation. In April 1972, the Lexington-Fayette Urban County Government incorporated the system under the local government and renamed the system Lextran. In 1997, Lextran introduced the Lexington Bluegrass Mobility Office. It offers carpooling and vanpooling computer ridematching services and LexVan, a work commute vanpool leasing program.

In 2003–2004 Lextran bought 13 low-floor Thomas 35 feet buses and 6 low-floor Gillig 40 feet buses in an attempt to make the system more accessible to those with physical disabilities.

In 2004, the system received additional funding from a successful ballot initiative to implement a new property tax dedicated to helping fund the Lextran system. Since the tax referendum passed, Lextran's system has grown by 50% and the number of passenger boardings and operators more than doubled.

In 2007, Lextran received several upgrades to its fleet of buses and facilities. A renovation and expansion of the main Lextran facilities on East Loudon Avenue expected to cost $7.5 million Lextran was also seeking $3.1 million for new buses, $1.5 million for an Automated Vehicle Locator, and $800,000 to purchase new fare boxes. Phase one of the expansion project includes the construction of a new bus fuel and wash building at 109 West Loudon Avenue, along with upgrades to the restrooms and break room at the Downtown Transit Center. Additionally, Lextran phased out all of their high-floor buses except for vans making all mainlines very accessible for those with disabilities.

In 2009, Lextran bought 3 Gillig Trolleys to start their trolley service. Even though trolley service is limited to specific events, Lextran still uses these buses on lower ridership lines as they are the same size as the smaller low-floor Gillig 29 feet buses.

In 2011, Lextran purchased 2 new hybrid electric and 5 Gillig 29 feet buses to be used on lower ridership routes.

Between 2012 and 2014, Lextran purchased an additional 6 Gillig 40 feet buses

In 2016, the bus fleet will increase from 73 as of January 2016 to 76 with 5 new Proterra Electric Busses and 7 new Gillig CNG Busses with 9 of Lextran's oldest Thomas transit buses similar to the European Dennis Dart being retired. In addition, the new Lextran depot located at 200 West Loudon Avenue which was the location of an old General Electric manufacturing plant. This new depot will allow much more space for onsite bus and employee parking compared to the old depot. There is also more space for maintenance facilities which are all fully equipped for all of their buses.

Current Lextran Routes 

Route 1 – Woodhill Drive
Route 2 – Georgetown Road
Route 3 – Tates Creek Road
Route 4 – Newtown Pike
Route 5 – Nicholasville Road
Route 6 – North Broadway
Route 7 – North Limestone
Route 8 – Versailles Road
Route 9 – Eastland
Route 10 – Hamburg Pavilion
Route 11 – Richmond Road
Route 12 – Leestown Road
Route 13 – South Broadway
Route 14 – UK Blue and White
Route 15 – Red Mile
Route 16 – Southland Drive
Route 17 – Northside Connector
Route 18 – Centre Parkway Connector
Route 22 – Mercer Road
Route 24 – Old Frankfort Pike
Route 27 – UK Yellow
Route 51 – Night – Woodhill Drive
Route 52 – Night – Georgetown Road
Route 58 – Night – Versailles Road
Route 59 – Night – Eastland

Route Frequency 

Mainlines are considered to be Routes 1 – 13. These routes operate from a 5:00 am departure until the midnight arrival at the Downtown Transit Center. Mainlines run every 35 minutes, some mainlines with lower ridership will reduce frequency during the day to only once every 70 minutes. On August 10, 2021, Lextran announced a Temporary Weekday Service Reduction on Six Routes which affected several mainline routes.  All mainlines are bi-directional until the 9:20 pm departure where some routes become combined routes with a nearby line, with one traveling outbound and the other inbound. Routes on Saturdays have reduced frequency with only once per hour frequency. Sunday routes are similar to Saturday routes, running once an hour. Sunday schedules run from 5:45 am – 9:00 pm, concluding with the final bus arriving at the Downtown Transit Center. Route 16 – Southland Drive is not considered a mainline bus, but still leaves from the Downtown Transit Center throughout the day (6:20 am – 7:00 pm once every 70 minutes).

Route 14 – UK Blue and White and Route 15 – Red Mile are circular routes that serve the UK Community and have the same fare as all other buses in Lextran. However, Lextran and the University of Kentucky partner to provide the Free City Transit program. Free City Transit allows all UK students, faculty, staff, and retirees to ride any Lextran route for free, simply by showing their valid Wildcard ID. UK passengers must present their Wildcard ID each time they board. The program is available year-round, but some routes run on an abbreviated schedule or not at all during summer months and holidays.

Route 17 – Northside Connector and Route 18 – Centre Parkway Connector are connecting routes which service areas not normally served by mainlines. Only Route 18 – Centre Parkway Connector provides service outside of peak hours and on Saturdays.

Lextran Fleet

References

External links 
 Official webpage

Bus transportation in Kentucky
Transportation in Lexington, Kentucky